Llanuwchllyn Football Club is a Welsh football team based near Bala in Wales. They play in the Ardal Leagues North East, which is in the third tier of the Welsh football league system.

The club raised money in 2020 to allow it to undertake the works required for the club to continue in Tier 3 after the reorganisation of the Welsh football pyramid.

Honours
Welsh National League (Wrexham Area) Division One – Runners-up: 2014–15; 2015–16

References

External links

Pitchero website

Football clubs in Wales
Welsh National League (Wrexham Area) Premier Division clubs
Ardal Leagues clubs